The Toff Goes to Market is a 1942 crime thriller novel by the British writer John Creasey. It was the eighth in his long-running featuring the gentleman amateur detective The Toff. It was one of a number of novels produced in the era that featured the booming wartime black market as a major plotline. It has been republished on a number of occasions.

References

Bibliography
 Reilly, John M. Twentieth Century Crime & Mystery Writers. Springer, 2015.
 Roodhouse, Mark. Black Market Britain: 1939-1955. OUP Oxford, 2013.

1942 British novels
Novels by John Creasey
British crime novels
British thriller novels
Novels set in London
John Long Ltd books